The 2012 Tokushima Vortis season sees Tokushima Vortis compete in J.League Division 2 for the eighth consecutive season. This is their 17th season overall in the second tier. Tokushima Vortis are also competing in the 2012 Emperor's Cup.

Players

Competitions

J.League

League table

Matches

Emperor's Cup

References

Tokushima Vortis
Tokushima Vortis seasons